Swiss Skydiver (foaled  March 10, 2017) is a retired American champion Thoroughbred racehorse who won the 2020 Preakness Stakes, only the sixth filly to win the second leg of the Triple Crown. She also won the 2020 Santa Anita Oaks, 2020 Alabama Stakes, and 2021 Beholder Mile.

Background
Swiss Skydiver is a chestnut filly with a white star bred in Kentucky by WinStar Farm. In 2018 she was consigned to the Keeneland Association September Yearling Sale and was bought for $35,000 by trainer Kenneth McPeek. She races in the red and blue colors of her owner Peter Callahan. He named the horse after his granddaughter Callie Rasnake who sent him a video message of her parachuting over the Swiss Alps in November 2018.

She is from the first crop foals sired by Daredevil, who recorded his biggest win in the 2014 Champagne Stakes. Daredevil began his stud career in Kentucky but was sold and exported to Turkey in 2019. Swiss Skydiver's dam Expo Gold showed modest ability on the track, winning two minor races from five starts. She is a female-line descendant of the broodmare Cloud High, making her a distant relative of the Belmont Stakes winner Da' Tara.

Racing career

2019: Two-Year-Old Season
Swiss Skydiver's first race was on November 16 at Churchill Downs, which she won. She returned less than two weeks later on November 20 to finish second in an Allowance Optional Claiming race.

2020: Three-Year-Old Season
Swiss Skydiver started off the 2020 season on January 18 with a 5th-place finish in the Gasparilla Stakes. She then came in 3rd in the Rachel Alexandra Stakes on February 15.

She got her first graded stakes win on March 28, when she won the Gulfstream Oaks. She came in at 9:1 odds and led the race before beating Lucrezia by  lengths.

She then earned her second graded stakes win on May 1, when she won the Fantasy Stakes. She came in as the underdog at 16:1 odds and defeated Venetian Harbor by  lengths.

Swiss Skydiver captured her third graded stakes win when she won the Santa Anita Oaks on June 6. She defeated Meneith by four lengths as the 3:5 favorite.

On July 11, she competed in her first race against male horses at the Blue Grass Stakes. She came in as the 2:1 favorite but was defeated by Art Collector by  lengths.

She came back to win the Alabama Stakes, the third leg of the New York Triple Tiara, by 3 1/2 lengths, establishing her as the top three-year-old filly of 2020 so far.

In the 2020 Kentucky Oaks, Swiss Skydiver ran in third place for most of the race, before passing the tiring favorite Gamine and just falling short of the eventual winner Shedaresthedevil.

Swiss Skydiver's biggest win of her career was the 2020 Preakness Stakes, the second leg of the Triple Crown, where she was the first filly win the race since Rachel Alexandra in 2009. Swiss Skydiver took the lead on the final turn and battled 2020 Kentucky Derby winner Authentic down the stretch, both well ahead of the rest of the field, in one of the most thrilling stretch duels in the history of the Triple Crown. Swiss Skydiver refused to let Authentic past her and she won by a neck. The third-place finisher, Jesus’ Team, was  behind Authentic. Swiss Skydiver's time of 1:53.28 was the second-fastest in Preakness history, behind only Secretariat’s 1:53.00 in 1973. She is only the ninth horse to ever break 1:54 in the 98 years that the Preakness has been run at  miles. 

Swiss Skydiver moved up to second in the NTRA Top Three-Year-Old Poll, and ninth in the NTRA Top Thoroughbred Poll.

Her next start could have been either the 2 million Breeders' Cup Distaff against her own gender and the champion mare Monomoy Girl, or the 6 million Breeders' Cup Classic against older males, where she would have a shot at Horse of the Year if she won. She had qualified for both races, the Alabama Stakes for the Distaff and the Preakness Stakes for the Classic. Her owner Peter Callahan was strongly leaning towards the Distaff, but trainer Kenny McPeek was keen to take a shot at the Classic.

Swiss Skydiver's connections chose the Breeders' Cup Distaff. But she stumbled badly coming out of the gate and her race was over before it even began. She moved into contention at the top of the homestretch before tiring to seventh place. Her stumble out of the gate left her no chance to win, but her connections hoped for a possible rematch with the winner Monomoy Girl in 2021.

For her thrilling Preakness Stakes win and coast to coast victories at nine different tracks, Swiss Skydiver was a nominee for the 2020 Secretariat Vox Populi Award. In the 2020 World's Best Racehorse Rankings, Swiss Skydiver was rated on 122, making her the equal twenty-first best racehorse in the world and the best three-year-old filly alongside Love and Gamine.

In January, the Eclipse Awards named Swiss Skydiver American Champion Three-Year-Old Filly of 2020. Bloodhorse.com later said she "soar[ed] to Champion 3-Year-Old Filly Title."

2021: Four-Year-Old Season
Swiss Skydiver ran her first race as a four-year-old in the Beholder Mile Stakes at Santa Anita Park. She broke fourth, and the leader Golden Principal who ran fractions of 23:14, 46.80 and 1:11.19. In the stretch, Swiss Skydiver took the lead and easily won with 2 ¾ lengths in a time of 1:36.18. The win was even more impressive because Swiss Skydiver had to ship out to California to face a strong field at 1/4 of a mile less than her ideal distance.

After that easy win, she was shipped to Oaklawn Park for a re-match with Monomoy Girl in the Apple Blossom Handicap at 1 1/16 miles. Everyone was firmly convinced that this would be a match race between Monomoy Girl and Swiss Skydiver. The third favorite, Letruska, immediately took the lead, while Swiss Skydiver ran on the railing and Monomoy Girl ran three wide. Letruska set fractions of 23.43, 47.96 and 1: 12.26. Robby Albarado let Swiss Skydiver run on the inside, just like she did in the Preakness Stakes. Next to her was Letruska and on the outside was Monomoy Girl. Monomoy Girl took the lead while Swiss Skydiver didn't fire. In the end, Letruska would come back and defeat Monomoy Girl with a short nose while Swiss Skydiver would finish 6 ½ lengths behind Letruska and Monomoy Girl.

Swiss Skydiver was going to make her next start in the Shuvee Stakes at Saratoga Racecourse on July 25, but a two-year-old filly in her barn tested positive for Equine Herpesvirus-1 and the barn was quarantined and none of the horses allowed to race until August 1.

Swiss Skydiver's next race was the Grade 1 Whitney Stakes against older males at Saratoga Racecourse on August 7.  About the Whitney, trainer Kenny McPeek said "fillies have won this race before. It's not my first choice, but I don't have any control over the fact that they're not going to let me run in the Shuvee. My preference would be to have an easier race first time back, but the powers that be said that's not going to, timing-wise, going to work. But she's capable of beating some of these horses. Is it ambitious? Yes. But so was the Preakness, so..." Swiss Skydiver also hasn't lost two races in a row for nearly eighteen months. Swiss Skydiver struggled to keep up with the front running Knicks Go and finished fourth beaten by over 10 lengths.

Retirement

On 9 November 2021, at the Fasig-Tipton November Sale in Lexington, Kentucky, Swiss Skydiver was sold for US$4.7 million, the third-highest price of the sale, to Katsumi Yoshida's Northern Farm.
Swiss Skydiver was exported to the United Kingdom and covered by Kingman.

Racing Statistics

Pedigree

References

2017 racehorse births
American racehorses
Racehorses bred in Kentucky
Racehorses trained in the United States
Thoroughbred family 5-i
Preakness Stakes winners